Androulla Agrotou (born 1 January 1947), is a Cypriot medical doctor, politician and former Minister of Health of Cyprus.

Androula Agrotou was born in Nicosia in 1947. She graduated from the Pancyprian Pallouriotissa Gymnasium in 1965 and studied at the Medical School of the University of Moscow.

She holds a postgraduate degree in Public Health and Business Administration with an emphasis on Public Administration and  holds the specialties of Hygiene - Community Medicine and General Medicine. In 1973, Agrotou became a Medical Officer at the Palaichori Health Center and subsequently at various Health Centers and First Aid Departments.

She then worked in the Department of Administration of the Ministry of Health, serving amongst other things the positions of the Senior Medical Officer and the First Medical Officer. Between 2007 and 2010 she served as Director of Medical Services and Public Health Services and she served as Deputy Director General of the Ministry of Health for a quarter before retiring (2010).

On 15 October 2012, was appointed Minister of Health of the Republic of Cyprus by decision of president Demetris Christofias.

References

1947 births
Moscow State University alumni
Cypriot public health doctors
Health ministers of Cyprus
Living people
People from Nicosia
21st-century Cypriot women politicians
21st-century Cypriot politicians
Progressive Party of Working People politicians
Women government ministers of Cyprus
21st-century women physicians
20th-century women physicians
Women public health doctors